Danger Guys is a series of children's books written by Tony Abbott and illustrated by Joanne Scribner. The series is about two children, Noodle and Zeek, who always seem to find themselves in danger.

Series
There are six books in the series.

 Danger Guys  (1994)  
 Danger Guys Blast Off
 Danger Guys: Hollywood Halloween (illustrated by Suwin Chan)
 Danger Guys Hit the Beach
 Danger Guys On Ice
 Danger Guys and the Golden Lizard

Plot summaries of the books

Danger Guys
Noodle and Zeek are excited about an adventure store opening in the local mall.

Once at the mall, they come face to face with two big guys who are unloading things from the back of a truck. Noodle and Zeek get in the truck to look at the stuff the guys are unloading, but the door closes behind them and the truck drives away. Later, the truck slows down, its doors fly open and Zeek is thrown out. Noodle jumps out to find him and once together they realise they are underground. 

They walk a little while and come to a huge opening. They see a temple which the two big guys are looting and have also kidnapped two explorers. Noodle and Zeek manage to outsmart the baddies and free the couple (but not before getting chased by a huge stone a la Indiana Jones).

See also

References

External links
 Book List

Series of children's books
American adventure novels
American children's novels
1990s children's books